Giorgia Fraiegari (born 18 July 1995) is an Italian professional racing cyclist, who currently rides for UCI Women's Continental Team  in road racing, and Italian team TRED Factory Racing–Hardskin in track cycling.

See also
 List of 2015 UCI Women's Teams and riders

References

External links
 

1995 births
Living people
Italian female cyclists
Place of birth missing (living people)
People from Latina, Lazio
Sportspeople from the Province of Latina
Cyclists from Lazio
21st-century Italian women